Altenbamberg is an Ortsgemeinde – a municipality belonging to a Verbandsgemeinde, a kind of collective municipality – in the Bad Kreuznach district in Rhineland-Palatinate, Germany. It belongs to the Verbandsgemeinde of Bad Kreuznach, whose seat is in the like-named town.

Geography

Location
The recreational village of Altenbamberg lies in the Alsenz valley on the edge of the North Palatine Uplands at an elevation of 130 m above sea level. The municipal area measures 753 ha, of which 286.5 ha is wooded, 50 ha is used for winegrowing (vineyards) and 226 ha is used for agriculture.

Neighbouring municipalities
Altenbamberg borders in the north on the town of Bad Münster am Stein-Ebernburg, in the northeast on the town of Bad Kreuznach, in the east on the municipalities of Frei-Laubersheim and Fürfeld, in the south on the municipality of Hochstätten and in the west on the municipality of Feilbingert.

History
The narrow stretch of the Alsenz valley where Altenbamberg now lies is known to have been settled even in prehistoric times. The Stone Age archaeological finds from the Altenbamberg and Neu-Bamberg area have yielded clues as to a settlement here in the New Stone Age. Traces of Bronze Age dwellings have been confirmed in this same area and also near Frei-Laubersheim and Siefersheim (the latter in the neighbouring Alzey-Worms district). It may be assumed that Bronze Age dwellings were represented in the North Palatine-Rhenish-Hessian region rather densely. In 1903, near the Schäferplacken (a wooded area) within Altenbamberg's limits, an archaeological dig at the Hünengräber ("Huns' Graves" – actually barrows) was undertaken with great eagerness. Recovered from this operation were grave goods that were most important to confirming the presence of an Iron Age culture in the area from about 750 to 15 BC. Right from the beginning, Altenbamberg's history has been bound to the castle, Altenbaumburg. This castle, which had its first documentary mention in 1129, was seat to the line of the Raugraves, descendants of the Emichones, who from 960 were counts in the Nahegau. The village's name has nothing to do with the Franconian town of Bamberg, but rather derives from the castle's name. Other names that the village has borne over the ages are as follows:
 1140: Bomeneburg
 1181: Boumburg
 1186: Boimeneburg
 1325: Burg Alten-Beymborg
 1391: Alten-Beimborg
 1394: Alten Beumburg
 1412: Alten Beinborg
 1429: Altenbeymburg
 1444: Alten Baymberg
 1518: Altenbaumburg
 1528: Altenbeymburg
 1681: Altenbaumberg
 1828: Altenbamberg
 1837: Altenbaumberg
In 1798, as a result of administrative restructuring in the wake of the French Revolution, Altenbamberg found itself in the Department of Mont-Tonnerre (or Donnersberg in German). After the Congress of Vienna, Altenbamberg passed to the Kingdom of Bavaria where it became part of the Rheinkreis, as the kingdom called the Palatinate, which was now a Bavarian exclave. The village remained with Bavaria until the end of the Second World War. In the course of administrative restructuring in Rhineland-Palatinate, Altenbamberg was transferred in 1969 from the Rockenhausen district (which itself was dissolved) to the Bad Kreuznach district, in which it remains today. With regard to ecclesiastical organization, Altenbamberg belongs as before to the Evangelical Church of the Palatinate and the Roman Catholic Diocese of Speyer.

Population development
The table shows Altenbamberg's population development. The figures in the table from 1871 to 1987 are based on censuses:

Religion
As at 31 August 2013, there are 739 full-time residents in Altenbamberg, and of those, 346 are Evangelical (46.82%), 203 are Catholic (27.47%), 1 is Russian Orthodox (0.135%), 1 is Lutheran (0.135%), 26 (3.518%) belong to other religious groups and 162 (21.922%) either have no religion or will not reveal their religious affiliation.

Politics

Municipal council

The council is made up of 12 council members, who were elected by majority vote at the municipal election held on 7 June 2009, and the honorary mayor as chairman.

Mayor
Altenbamberg's mayor is Holger Markus Conrad, elected in 2019.

Coat of arms
The municipality's arms might be described thus: Argent in base ground with a mount in the middle vert upon which and to each side a tree of the same, under the trees a bar wavy of the field and in chief, each side of the middle tree two mullets Or.

The arms violate a traditional rule of heraldry by placing a metal upon another metal (the gold mullets on the silver field).

Culture and sightseeing

Buildings
The following are listed buildings or sites in Rhineland-Palatinate's Directory of Cultural Monuments:
 Hauptstraße 39 – Catholic Church of the Nativity of Mary and Saint Maurice (Katholische Kirche Maria Geburt und St. Mauritius); Late Baroque aisleless church, 1783
 Hauptstraße – Protestant church; Classicist aisleless church, 1821–1823
 New Jewish Graveyard (monumental zone) – walled area with 23 gravestones, 1884 to 1937, at the Christian graveyard
 Am Rödelstein – railway station; Gründerzeit building, partly timber-frame, timber-frame goods shed, late 19th century
 Am Rödelstein 2 – villa, about 1860, one-floor addition
 At Burgstraße 4 – house door with fanlight, marked 1809
 Burgstraße 12 (?) – Baroque timber-frame house, marked 1770
 Burgstraße 20 – timber-frame house, Renaissance portal, 16th century, ground floor altered in the 19th century
 Burgstraße 22 – Baroque timber-frame house, 18th century
 Burgstraße 26 – timber-frame house, 18th or early 19th century
 At Burgstraße 27 – spolia marked 1580
 Graveyard – Kastl-Voelker gravestone, façade, relief of a mourner, about 1900
 Old Jewish Graveyard (monumental zone), Am Judengraben/Narrenbrunnen am Schloßberg – area laid out in 1750 with 10 gravestones
 Brücklocherhof, on Kreisstraße 85 – 18th and earlier half of the 19th century; commercial building partly timber-frame
 Am Bernhardsschlößchen – Castle Treuenfels ruin (so-called Bernhardschlößchen), quarrystone walls of castle ruin, 1253; built as free-standing outwork of Castle Altenbaumburg (see next entry)
 Castle Altenbaumburg (monumental zone) – neck ditch and shield wall, rectangular tower, wall remnants 13th century, remnants of Gothic dwelling buildings and the Gothic chapel of the Raugraves' castle seat mentioned in 1129 and fallen into ruin in 1482; the Gothic palas reconstructed in 1981–1983 (see also gallery below)
 Eilbacher Hang – vineyard house; Gründerzeit clinker brick building, about 1890

Regular events
Many visitors from near and far come each year to the Burgfest ("Castle Festival") to celebrate in a special atmosphere and enjoy the Altenbamberg wine.

Sport and leisure
Outing destinations are the Altenbaumburg, the Treuenfels (both castle ruins), the Schäferplacken and the Rödelstein. There is an outstanding hiking trail network with a grilling facility and a shelter in wooded surroundings.

Economy and infrastructure

Transport
Leading through Altenbamberg is Bundesstraße 48. Serving the village is a railway station on the Alsenz Valley Railway (Alsenztalbahn).

Economic structure
Altenbamberg lies in the Nahe wine region, and still has one full-time winemaker. For the villagers, there are a supermarket and a bakery. Medical services are being taken over mainly by the bordering towns of Bad Münster am Stein-Ebernburg and Bad Kreuznach. There are also "gastronomical" establishments with ten beds.

Churches
Altenbamberg also has one Evangelical church and one Catholic church, each with weekly services.

References

External links

 Municipality's official webpage 
 Altenbamberg in the collective municipality's webpages 
 Literature about Altenbamberg at Rheinland-Pfälzische Landesbibliographie 

Bad Kreuznach (district)
Palatinate (region)